Sander Idrettslag is a Norwegian multi-sports club from Sander, Hedmark. It has sections for association football and Nordic skiing. The club was founded in 1920.

The men's football team plays in the 4. divisjon, the fifth tier of Norwegian football. It was a mainstay in the 3. divisjon from 1998 to 2010 and later had two shorter stints in 2012–2014 and 2016. Sander's proximity to the city of Kongsvinger meant that several players featured for Sander before or after playing for Kongsvinger IL, including Norway international Martin Linnes.

References

Official site

Football clubs in Norway
Sport in Hedmark
Sør-Odal
1920 establishments in Norway
Association football clubs established in 1920